Željko Mitraković (born 30 December 1972) is a Slovenian football manager and former player.

Between 1998 and 2004, Mitraković earned seven appearances for the Slovenian national team.

References

External links
Željko Mitraković at NZS 

1972 births
Living people
Footballers from Ljubljana
Slovenian footballers
Slovenia under-21 international footballers
Slovenia international footballers
Association football midfielders
NK Svoboda Ljubljana players
ND Gorica players
K.S.C. Lokeren Oost-Vlaanderen players
NK Primorje players
NK Domžale players
Ethnikos Achna FC players
NK Ivančna Gorica players
NK Bela Krajina players
NK Olimpija Ljubljana (2005) players
NK Triglav Kranj players
NK Dob players
Slovenian PrvaLiga players
Slovenian Second League players
Belgian Pro League players
Cypriot First Division players
Slovenian expatriate footballers
Slovenian expatriate sportspeople in Belgium
Expatriate footballers in Belgium
Slovenian expatriate sportspeople in Cyprus
Expatriate footballers in Cyprus
Slovenian expatriate sportspeople in Austria
Expatriate footballers in Austria
Slovenian football managers
NK Rudar Velenje managers
ND Ilirija 1911 managers
Place of birth missing (living people)